Marion Max Wilks (born February 9, 1936) is an American former politician in the state of Florida.

Wilks was born in Milton, Florida and attended Auburn University. He worked in electrical engineering and construction. Wilks served in the Florida House of Representatives from 1965 to 1966, as a Democrat, representing Santa Rosa County.

References

Living people
1936 births
Democratic Party members of the Florida House of Representatives
People from Milton, Florida